Paul Atkinson may refer to:

Paul Atkinson (footballer, born 1961), English football player who played for Oldham, Watford and Burnley
Paul Atkinson (footballer, born 1966), English football player who played for Sunderland and Port Vale
Paul Atkinson (guitarist) (1946–2004), pop guitarist in The Zombies
Paul Atkinson (confessor) (1655–1729), English Roman Catholic priest
Paul Atkinson (basketball) (born 1999), American basketball player